Rhesala imparata is a moth of the family Erebidae first described by Francis Walker in 1865. It is sometimes referred to as an Albizia defoliator. It is found in Sri Lanka, India, Taiwan, Singapore and Borneo.

The wingspan of the adult is 10–11 mm. The body of the caterpillar is cylindrical, slightly wider centrally and a dull, wrinkled, a plain watery grass greenish. Head shining light orange, with long brown setae. Pupation takes place in a close, ovoid silk cocoon. Pupa lack a bloom. Caterpillars are known to feed on Acacia, Albizia, Delonix, Tamarindus and Samanea species. The moth was newly discovered as a pest on Boswellia serrata from India.

References

Moths of Asia
Moths described in 1865